Vadim istrati (born 7 August 1988, Chișinău) is a Moldovan footballer, who currently plays for CF Sparta Selemet în "B" Division (South), as goalkeeper.

References

Association football goalkeepers
Moldovan footballers
1988 births
Living people
Footballers from Chișinău
FC Academia Chișinău players
FC Sfîntul Gheorghe players
FC Milsami Orhei players
Kramfors-Alliansen Fotboll players